2-Chloro-1,1,1-trifluoroethane, also known as 1,1,1-trifluoro-2-chloroethane or Freon 133a, is an alkyl halide belonging to the category of chlorofluorocarbons, having chemical formula F3C-CH2-Cl. Under standard conditions, it appears as a colorless gas, partially soluble in water. It is used as a refrigerant, as a solvent and as a reagent in organic synthesis.

References

Halogenated solvents
Hydrochlorofluorocarbons
Refrigerants
Trifluoromethyl compounds